Ma Jia (born 4 February 1998) is a Chinese para swimmer.
Ma competed in her first Paralympic games at the 2020 Tokyo Paralympics, where she won two gold medals in the 50 metre freestyle (WR 29.20) and in the 200m Individual Medley SM11 (WR 2:42.14).

References

1998 births
Living people
Paralympic gold medalists for China
Paralympic swimmers of China
Chinese female freestyle swimmers
Swimmers at the 2020 Summer Paralympics
Medalists at the 2020 Summer Paralympics
S11-classified Paralympic swimmers
Paralympic medalists in swimming
Chinese female medley swimmers
21st-century Chinese women